is a Japanese judoka.

Takato is currently the top ranked judoka in the world in the extra-lightweight division. He became one of judo's most prominent fighters by winning the 2013 World Championships. In the same year, he also won the Masters in Tyumen, and the prestigious Grand Slams in Paris, Tokyo and Moscow. With these successes, Takato was ranked No. 1 in the world in 2013 and 2014. He had an all-win record in 2013. Specializing in drop kata guruma, his physical and technical fighting style has become iconic in judo.

Outside the mat, Takato was one of the most searched judokas in 2015, and the top earning male judoka on the IJF circuit since 2012. He is the most-decorated judoka on the IJF World Tour, winning more gold medals in Grand Slam competitions than anyone else.

Takato won the bronze medal as Japan's extra-lightweight representative at the 2016 Olympics and won the gold medal in the same event at the 2020 Olympics held in Tokyo, Japan.

Early life
Takato began judo at the age of 7. He joined Nogi-machi judo club as an elementary school student, which was also attended by future teammate Masashi Ebinuma. He had won in various weight divisions throughout elementary and middle school.

An alma mater of Sagami junior high and high school, he won several national titles representing the school as well as the world cadet championships. He started attending Tokai University in 2012, and had graduated in 2016.

Career

2016 Grand Slam Tokyo
Takato returned to the Grand Slam in Tokyo for his first outing after the Olympics. He faced Yanislav Gerchev of Bulgaria in his first fight, and showed his form with sode tsurikomi goshi, successfully scoring yuko and waza-ari with the skill. He then faced Korea's Choi In Hyuk in a deadlocked fight. Despite being scoreless, Choi was penalised twice for passivity, driving Takato through to the semi-final. The bout was another tight fight as scores were nil, neither being able to successfully throw. After nearly ten minutes of play, Takato finally had a breakthrough with kosoto gari for yuko for a place in the final.

It was an all-Japan bout in the final, with Ryuju Nagayama as his opponent. Both are trained by Minoru Konegawa, and had a 48 place difference in world rankings, with Takato ranked seventh and Nagayama 56th at the time. Takato attempted throughout the bout to bring the fight to newaza, however was unable to break Nagayama's defense. He most notably used sankaku jime. With one minute left, Takato attempted ashi guruma, but was unsuccessful and was left with a disadvantageous position as Nagayama was standing up. Nagayama then used uchi mata to throw Takato for ippon. The upset left Takato smiling as he congratulated Nagayama, settling for a silver medal.

2017 Grand Slam Paris
Takato opened his international competition in 2017 with the Grand Slam in Paris. This would be the first event that would utilise revised rules of judo. He faced local Vincent Manquest in his first fight and scored waza-ari with seoi nage. He then earned ippon with kesa-gatame after bringing the fight to the ground, going through to round 3. Takato fired an early waza-ari with kouchi gari, and scored a second using ouchi gari. He then transitioned to newaza, pinning his opponent again with kesa gatame, showing a versatility masterclass.

In the quarter-final he faced Georgia's Amiran Papinashvili. The bout only lasted 40 seconds, as Takato threw him for ippon with kouchi gari. He then went against Azerbaijan's Orkhan Safarov, who was the only fighter in the tournament to throw Takato for a score with kosoto gari. However, with Takato scoring two waza-aris, both using kouchi gari, and then eventually scoring ippon, he was through to the final. Takato won his final fight by waza-ari, again with kouchi gari, and another newaza ippon with ushiro yoko shiho gatame. This would be Takato's third win at Paris, having won in 2013 and 2015. With this victory, he ranked world number one, and had an all-ippon tournament.

Fighting style
He is known for having a more modern style of fighting than traditional Japanese judo, with kata guruma being one of his favorite techniques.

Rivalries
Takato's international rivals include Dashdavaagiin Amartüvshin, Kim Won-jin, Yeldos Smetov, Ganbatyn Boldbaatar and Beslan Mudranov. He has competed against them a total of twenty times.

Personal life
Takato married in 2014 and has a son who was born on 25 August that year.

Competitive record

(as of 11 February 2017)

Medal record

2009
 World U17 Championships −60 kg, Budapest
2011
 World U20 Championships −60 kg, Cape Town
 Grand Prix −60 kg, Qingdao
 Grand Slam −60 kg, Tokyo
2012
 Grand Slam −60 kg, Moscow
 Grand Slam −60 kg, Tokyo
 World Cup −60 kg, Tashkent
2013
 Grand Slam −60 kg, Paris
 Masters −60 kg, Tyumen
 World Championships −60 kg, Rio de Janeiro
 Grand Slam −60 kg, Tokyo
2014
 Grand Prix −60 kg, Budapest
 World Championships −60 kg, Chelyabinsk
2015
 Masters −60 kg, Tyumen
 Grand Slam −60 kg, Paris
 Grand Slam −60 kg, Tokyo
2016
 Olympic Games −60 kg, Rio de Janeiro
 Grand Slam −60 kg, Tokyo
2017
 Grand Slam −60 kg, Paris
 Grand Slam −60 kg, Tokyo
2018
 Grand Prix −60 kg, Zagreb
2021
 Olympic Games −60 kg, Tokyo

References

External links
 

1993 births
Living people
Japanese male judoka
World judo champions
Tokai University alumni
Judoka at the 2016 Summer Olympics
Judoka at the 2020 Summer Olympics
Olympic bronze medalists for Japan
Olympic gold medalists for Japan
Medalists at the 2016 Summer Olympics
Medalists at the 2020 Summer Olympics
Olympic judoka of Japan
Olympic medalists in judo
Sportspeople from Saitama Prefecture
20th-century Japanese people
21st-century Japanese people